SHP or shp may refer to:

 Saint Helena pound, currency
 Sacred Heart Preparatory (Atherton, California), a US school
 Seton Hall Preparatory School, West Orange, New Jersey, US
 Shaft horsepower
 Shapefile, for GIS software
 Shek Pai stop (MTR station code), Hong Kong
 Shepperton railway station (National Rail station code), Surrey, England
 Shipibo language (ISO 639-3 code), Peru and Brazil
 Single Homeless Project, a UK charity
 Small heterodimer partner, a protein
 Small hydro power plant
 Social Democratic People's Party (Turkey) (Sosyaldemokrat Halk Partisi), 2002-2010
 Social Democratic Populist Party (Turkey) (Sosyaldemokrat Halkçı Parti), 1985-1995
 State Highway Patrol
 Strategic Hamlet Program, during Vietnam War
 Swanson Health Products, US
 Qinhuangdao Shanhaiguan Airport, China, IATA code
 Columbia University Science Honors Program